The Dominican Republic national under-17 football team is the association football team that represents the nation of Dominican Republic at the under-17 level.

Players

Current squad
The following 20 players have been named in the final roster for the 2023 Concacaf Men’s Under-17 Championship held in Guatemala from February 11-26, 2023.

Head coach: Mariano Pérez Tejada

See also
Dominican Republic national football team
Dominican Republic national under-23 football team
Dominican Republic national under-20 football team

References

Dominican Republic national football team